Shiori Kinoshita (born 17 August 1992) is a Japanese professional footballer who plays as a defender for WE League club Chifure AS Elfen Saitama.

Club career 
Kinoshita made her WE League debut on 12 September 2021.

References 

Living people
1992 births
Japanese women's footballers
Women's association football defenders
Association football people from Kanagawa Prefecture
Chifure AS Elfen Saitama players
WE League players